Follow the Leader (a.k.a. Manhattan Mary) is a 1930 American pre-Code musical comedy film, starring Ed Wynn and Ginger Rogers. It was by and distributed by Paramount Publix Corporation.

Cast
Ed Wynn - Crickets
Ginger Rogers - Mary Brennan
Stanley Smith (actor) - Jimmy Moore
Lou Holtz - Sam Platz
Lida Lane - Ma Brennan
Ethel Merman - Helen King
Bobby Watson - George White
Donald Kirke - R. C. Black
William Halligan - Bob Sterling
Holly Hall - Fritzie Devere
Preston Foster - Two-Gun Terry
James C. Morton - Mickie
Tammany Young - Bull
Jack La Rue - A Gangster
William Gargan - A Gangster
William Black - 
Dick Scott - 
Jules Epailly - Gaston Duval
Charles Henderson -

References

External links

1930 films
1930 musical comedy films
Films directed by Norman Taurog
1930s English-language films
American musical comedy films
American black-and-white films
1930s American films